Virna Giannina Flores Di Liberto (Lima, Perú, February 13, 1977) is a Peruvian actress, based in Miami.

Biography 
She began acting on television in soap operas Peru's rich and Love Vicky Serrano.

Then, she strengthened her acting career by participating in Maria Emilia, dear, Miracles and Ecstasy.

She recorded in 2002 for the wild Cat telenovela co-produced by Venevision and Fonovideo. The following year she participated in cheeky Love, American telenovela Telemundo. In 2004 she played for the telenovela Inocente de ti.

She returned to Peru in 2006 to star in Amores like ours with Ismael La Rosa. The following year she starred in the telenovela Cornered, Venevision International.

In 2008 she starred in the soap opera produced by Telemundo Betrayal. The following year she participated in an episode of the Fox series Final time.

In December 2008 she married the actor Ismael La Rosa, after 12 years of relationship and in 2010 their first child was born.

References

1977 births
Living people
Actresses from Lima
Peruvian telenovela actresses
21st-century Peruvian actresses
Peruvian emigrants to the United States